
Michael Jude Reyes (born 1955) is an American billionaire businessman, co-chairman (with his brother J. Christopher Reyes) of Reyes Holdings, a beer and food distribution holding company, which includes the Martin-Brower Company, McDonald's's largest distributor.

Early life
Jude Reyes was born in 1955 in Washington DC. He earned a bachelor's degree from Wofford College.

Career
According to Forbes, Reyes has a net worth of $6.8 billion, as of June 2020.

Personal life
Reyes is married to Lori Welch Reyes, they have three children and live in Palm Beach, Florida.

References 

1955 births
Living people
American businesspeople
American billionaires
Wofford College alumni